Greenleaf Peak is a mountain in the Cascade Range in the U.S. state of Washington, located on the north side of the Columbia River near Table Mountain, in the Columbia River Gorge. The peak lies within the Columbia River Gorge National Scenic Area near Bonneville Dam. Botanist David Douglas climbed to the summit in September 1825, making this the first recorded mountain ascent in what is now Washington state.

Just south of the summit of Greenleaf Peak there is a dramatic escarpment called Red Bluffs, which connects Greenleaf Peak and Table Mountain. Approximately  of the Eagle Creek formation are exposed at Red Bluffs. The Red Bluffs escarpment was created by the repeated collapse of Greenleaf Peak and Table Mountain. Massive landslides have fallen from the mountains, creating a  area of debris called the Cascade Landslide Complex. The largest and most studied landslide is known as the Bonneville Slide, which created the Bridge of the Gods and Cascade Rapids The topography of the landslide complex is uneven with roughly rolling hills and abrupt slopes. The whole area is inclined south toward and beyond the Columbia River. There may have been a cinder cone between Greenleaf Peak and Table Mountain which collapsed during the Bonneville Slide.

The propensity of the area south of Greenleaf Peak and Table Mountain to collapse in landslides is due to the Eagle Creek formation. The formation is topped with basalt. Water can percolate through the basalt and saturate the Eagle Creek formation. In places where the formation is relatively close to the surface and inclined downslope, such as near Greenleaf Peak and Table Mountain, water saturation can cause the formation's material to slide away, carrying the overlying basalt with it.

Between Greenleaf Peak and Table Mountain, and above the Red Bluffs, lies Greenleaf Basin. The basin averages  in elevation and is covered with forested wetlands. Greenleaf Creek flows south through the basin before plunging as a waterfall over the Red Bluffs escarpment.

In the winter of 2007-2008, there was a large landslide on the south slope of Greenleaf Peak, in the state-owned Table Mountain Natural Resources Conservation Area.

References

External links

 

Mountains of Washington (state)
Cascade Range
Mountains of Skamania County, Washington
Columbia River Gorge
Landslides in the United States